This article presents lists of the literary events and publications in 1765.

Events
January 10 – Arthur Murphy introduces Hester Thrale and her husband to Samuel Johnson.
August 12 – I'tisam-ud-Din writes the Treaty of Allahabad between the Mughal Empire and the British East India Company
October 10 – Samuel Johnson's edition of The Plays of William Shakespeare is published in London after ten years in the making.
unknown date – Denis Diderot completes the Encyclopédie.
Approximate year – Beginning of the Sturm und Drang movement in German literature.

New books

Fiction
Henry Brooke – The Fool of Quality (volume one; the fifth and last appeared in 1770)
Madame Riccoboni – L'Histoire d'Ernestine
Laurence Sterne – The Life and Opinions of Tristram Shandy, Gentleman (vol vii–viii)

Children
Anonymous – The History of Little Goody Two-Shoes (attributed to Oliver Goldsmith)

Drama
Isaac Bickerstaffe – operas
Daphne and Amintor
The Maid of the Mill
Dorothea Biehl – Den listige Optrækkerske
George Colman the Elder – The Comedies of Terence
Ramón de la Cruz – El Prado por la noche
Charles Dibdin – The Shepherd's Artifice
Samuel Foote – The Commissary
Carlo Gozzi – L'augellino bel verde
Elizabeth Griffith – The Platonic Wife
Michel-Jean Sedaine – Philosophe sans le savoir
William Shirley – Electra

Poetry

James Beattie
The Judgment of Paris
Verses Occasioned by the Death of Charles Churchill
William Collins – Works
Edward Jerningham – An Elegy Written Among the Ruins of an Abbey
James Macpherson – The Works of Ossian
Thomas Percy – Reliques of Ancient English Poetry
Christopher Smart – A Translation of the Psalms of David
Percival Stockdale – Churchill Defended
Nicolás Fernandez de Moratín – La Diana o Arte de la caza

Non-fiction
William Blackstone – Commentaries on the Laws of England (publication begins)
John Bunyan (died 1688) – Imprisonment of Mr. John Bunyan
Anders Chydenius – The National Gain
Benito Jerónimo Feijóo y Montenegro – Opera omnia
Henry Fuseli – Reflections on the Painting and Sculpture of the Greeks (translation of Johann Joachim Winckelmann)
Oliver Goldsmith – Essays
William Kenrick – A Review of Doctor Johnson's New Edition of Shakespeare
Filip Lastrić
Epitome vetustatum Bosnensis provinciae

Friedrich Christoph Oetinger – Swedenborg und anderer Irrdische und himmlische Philosophie
Joseph Priestley – Essay on a Course of Liberal Education for Civil and Active Life
George Alexander Stevens – The Celebrated Lecture on Heads
Tobias Smollett – Continuation of the History of England (a supplement to Hume's History of England; final volume)
Pedro Rodríguez, Conde de Campomanes – Tratado de la regalía de amortización

Births
January 4 – Jacob Grimm, German philologist and mythologist (died 1863)
January 11 – Antoine Alexandre Barbier, French librarian (died 1825)
March 27 – Franz Xaver von Baader, German philosopher (died 1841)
April 22 – James Grahame, Scottish poet (died 1811)
September 14 – Carl Friedrich Ernst Frommann, German bookseller (died 1837)
September 15 – Manuel Maria Barbosa du Bocage, Portuguese poet (died 1805)
October 24 – James Mackintosh, Scottish historian (died 1832)
November 30 – Johann Friedrich Abegg, German theologian (died 1840)
unknown date – Jippensha Ikku (十返舎 一九 Shigeta Sadakazu), Japanese novelist (died 1831)
Probable year of birth – Henry Luttrell, English wit (died 1851)

Deaths
March 3 – William Stukeley, English antiquary (born 1687)
April 5 – Edward Young, English poet, playwright and literary theorist (born 1683)
April 11 – Lewis Morris, Welsh poet, antiquary and lexicographer (born 1701)
April 15 – Mikhail Lomonosov, Russian polymath (born 1711)
April 23 – Sarah Dixon, English poet (born 1671 or 1672)
May 1 – Franz Neumayr, German controversialist and theologian (born 1697)
December 31 – Samuel Madden, Irish social and political writer (born 1686)
Unknown date
David Mallet, Scottish poet and playwright (born c. 1705)
James Ridley (Sir Charles Morell), English novelist and story writer (born 1736)

References

 
Years of the 18th century in literature